The Jewish Museum of Greece is a museum in Athens, Greece.  It was established by Nicholas Stavroulakis in 1977 to preserve the material culture of the Greek Jews.

Gallery

See also
Jewish Museum of Thessaloniki
Jewish Museum of Rhodes
History of the Jews in Greece
Holocaust Museum of Greece
Romaniote Jews

References

External links

 
 City of Athens
 Hellenic Ministry of Culture and Tourism
 American Friends of the Jewish Museum of Greece
 Jewish Museum of Rhodes

Museums in Athens
Jewish museums in Greece
Jewish Greek history
Museums established in 1977
Jews and Judaism in Greece
1977 establishments in Greece